Ngwa can refer to:
The Ngwa People, an Igbo group in Nigeria
Ngwa, the postal romanization of the name of the Wuhua County in China's Guangdong Province